The Ministry of Information (Arabic: وزارة الإعلام) is a cabinet ministry of Yemen.

List of Ministers 

 Moamar al-Eryani (18 September 2016 – present)
 Mohamed al-Qubati (1 December 2015 – 18 September 2016)
 Nadia al-Sakkaf (7 November 2014 – 1 December 2015)
 Nasr Taha Mustafa (June 2014 – November 2014)
 Ali al-Amrani (7 December 2011 – June 2014)
 Hassan al-Lawzi (11 February 2006 – 2011)
 Hussein Dhaif Allah al-Awadi (4 April 2001)
 Abdulrahman al-Akwa'a (1997)
 Mohamed Salem Basindwa (6 October 1994)
 Hassan al-Lawzi (1993)
 Mohamed Jurhum (1990)

See also 
Politics of Yemen

References 

Government ministries of Yemen